Sacred Heart High School is a Roman Catholic high school for girls in the Lincoln Heights neighborhood of Los Angeles, California. Located in the Roman Catholic Archdiocese of Los Angeles, the school was founded by the Dominican Sisters of Mission San Jose in 1907.

History
Sacred Heart Academy was founded in 1907, one of the first girls' high schools founded in the Archdiocese of Los Angeles. The Dominican Sisters of Mission San Jose had already established an elementary school in 1890 when they were asked to open a high school. The De La Salle Brothers taught the younger boys until 1925 when Cathedral High School was opened. In 1949 Sacred Heart Academy became Sacred Heart High School and was placed under the jurisdiction of the Sacred Heart Parish. In 1979 it became an Archdiocesan school.

External links

 
 Archdiocese of Los Angeles Official Website

Notes and references

Girls' schools in California
Roman Catholic secondary schools in Los Angeles County, California
Educational institutions established in 1907
High schools in Los Angeles
1907 establishments in California
Lincoln Heights, Los Angeles
Dominican schools in the United States
Catholic secondary schools in California